Sonia Elizabeth Sinclair, JP (née Graham; formerly Mond; born 6 September 1928), known as Sonia Melchett, is an English socialite and author. Formerly married to Julian Mond, Baron Melchett, she married the writer Andrew Sinclair after her husband's death.

Early life
Sonia Melchett was born in British India on 6 September 1928, the eldest daughter of Lt-Col Roland Harris Graham and Kathleen (née Dunbar) Graham, of The Lodge, Bridge, Kent. Her father, of a County Fermanagh family, was educated at Cambridge University and  Trinity College, Dublin, and served in the Royal Army Medical Corps in the Second World War. Sonia Melchett was educated at the Royal School, Bath. Her younger sister Daphne married Major Anthony Henry Ivor Kinsman and became an actress, broadcaster and writer. She was the presenter of the BBC news programme Look North and wrote the book Pawn takes Castle.

Personal life 
Sonia Graham married the Honourable Julian Edward Alfred Mond, younger son of Henry Mond, 2nd Baron Melchett and Amy Gwen Mond Baroness Melchett (née Wilson) on 26 April 1947, and became Lady Melchett on the death of her father-in-law on 22 January 1949. Mond was the inaugural chairman of the newly privatised British Steel Corporation. For most of their married life they lived on Tite Street in Chelsea, London and on Courtyard Farm Ringstead, Hunstanton, Norfolk. Melchett was a trustee of Royal Court Theatre and the NSPCC.

They built a villa, Casa Melchett, near Formentor in Majorca and took family holidays there. Julian Mond died while on holiday there on 15 June 1973. They had one son, Peter Robert Henry Mond and two daughters, Kerena Ann Mond and Pandora Shelley Mond. Kerena married Richard Moorehead, son of the war correspondent and author Alan Moorehead in 1980, and secondly in 1985 married journalist and broadcaster Adam Boulton. Pandora is an artist, who, in 1991, married Nicholas Wesolowski. On 25 July 1984, Lady Melchett remarried, to Andrew Sinclair, a novelist, historian, biographer, critic, filmmaker and founding member of Churchill College, Cambridge.

Sonia Melchett has seven grandchildren.

Publications 
 From the Ganges to The Thames: A Memoir, 2016. 
 Passionate Quests Five Modern Women Travellers, Faber and Faber, 1992.   
 Someone is missing : a memoir, Weidenfeld & Nicolson, London, 1987  I
 Sons and Mothers, Virago Press, 1996 by Victoria Glendinning (Editor), Matthew Glendinning (Lady Sonia Melchett was one of seven contributors);

References

Sources
 Bright Young Things, Oxford University 
 The Independent on Sunday, 30 October 2005 'Beyond the Fringe' 
 The Independent on Sunday, 30 March 2003 'The Talk of the Town guide to Shocking London' 
 BBC News, Tuesday, 27 July 1999 'Lord Melchett: Aristocrat eco-warrior' 
 The Daily Telegraph, Mandrake, 'Reunited atlLast' 11.06. 2005, 
 Anna Ford/Jonathan Aitken incident  
 Michael Alexander, a member of the Chelsea Set 
 Nigel Dempster, Daily Telegraph, 13.07.2007 

1928 births
Living people
People from Nainital
People from Chelsea, London
People from King's Lynn and West Norfolk (district)
People educated at the Royal School for Daughters of Officers of the Army
Sonia Melchett
Writers from London
English socialites
English justices of the peace
British baronesses
National Society for the Prevention of Cruelty to Children people